The gens Postumulena was an obscure plebeian family at ancient Rome.  Few members of this gens are mentioned in history, but others are known from inscriptions.

Origin
The nomen Postumulenus belongs to a class of names formed primarily from other gentilicia, using the suffix -enus.  In this case, the nomen is a lengthened form of Postumius, derived from the old Latin praenomen Postumus.  This name is derived from the adjective postremus, "hindmost" or "last", and originally referred to a last-born child, although in later times it was confused with posthumus, "after burial", being applied to children born after their fathers' death.

Praenomina
The only praenomina associated with the Postumuleni are Lucius, Marcus, and Gaius, the three most common names throughout Roman history, and perhaps Publius, known from a filiation, and also very common.

Members

 Postumulenus, mentioned by Cicero as a friend of someone named Trebianus or Trebonius.
 Marcus Postumulenus, the freedman of Jucundus, buried at Carthage in Africa Proconsularis.
 Postumulena P. l. Agapema, buried at Trebula Mutusca in Sabinum.
 Postumulenus Atimetus, patron of Postumulena Symmone, who built a tomb for him at Ostia in Latium.
 Postumulena Chara, wife of Lucius Postumulenus Thalamus, who built a tomb for himself and his wife at Portus in Latium.
 Marcus Postumulenus Fidelis, built a tomb at Rome for his nephew, Marcus Memmius Rufus, aged five years, three months, and eleven days.
 Postumulena C. f. Ingenua, daughter of Gaius Postumulenus Ingenuus and Tuccia Trophime.
 Gaius Postumulenus Ingenuus, husband of Tuccia Trophime, and father of Postumulena Ingenua, buried with his wife at Rome.
 Lucius Postumulenus L. Ɔ. l. Mama, a freedman buried at Rome.
 Lucius Postumulenus Nicephorus, husband of Nonia Verecunda, and father of Sotidia Maxima, buried in a family sepulchre at Canusium in Apulia, dating to the first or second centuries AD.
 Gaius Postumulenus Paullus, named in an inscription from Narnia in Umbria.
 Lucius Postumulenus Primitivus, husband of Curtilia Glyconis, who dedicated a tomb for him at Rome.
 Postumulena Ɔ. l. Rufa, a freedwoman buried at Rome.
 Postumulena L. f. Sabina, buried at Ateste in Venetia and Histria.
 Marcus Postumulenus Secundus, a soldier serving in the century of Decimus Roetius Secundus at Rome in AD 70.
 Postumulena Symmone, client of Postumulenus Atimetus, for whom she built a tomb at Ostia.
 Lucius Postumulenus Thalamus, built a tomb at Portus for himself and his wife, Postumulena Chara.
 Postumulena Ɔ. l. Vitalis, buried at Ateste.

See also
 List of Roman gentes

References

Bibliography
 Marcus Tullius Cicero, Epistulae ad Familiares.
 Dictionary of Greek and Roman Biography and Mythology, William Smith, ed., Little, Brown and Company, Boston (1849).
 Theodor Mommsen et alii, Corpus Inscriptionum Latinarum (The Body of Latin Inscriptions, abbreviated CIL), Berlin-Brandenburgische Akademie der Wissenschaften (1853–present).
 Notizie degli Scavi di Antichità (News of Excavations from Antiquity, abbreviated NSA), Accademia dei Lincei (1876–present).
 Bulletin Archéologique du Comité des Travaux Historiques et Scientifiques (Archaeological Bulletin of the Committee on Historic and Scientific Works, abbreviated BCTH), Imprimerie Nationale, Paris (1885–1973).
 René Cagnat et alii, L'Année épigraphique (The Year in Epigraphy, abbreviated AE), Presses Universitaires de France (1888–present).
 George Davis Chase, "The Origin of Roman Praenomina", in Harvard Studies in Classical Philology, vol. VIII (1897).

Roman gentes